RAPL may refer to:

 L-lysine cyclodeaminase, an enzyme
 Running average power limit, an Intel processor feature
 Right Adjoints Preserve Limits, a theorem regarding adjoint functors in category theory.